Three ships of the United States Navy (and one of the Confederate States Navy) have been named for the 15th state:
 The Mississippi Flotilla captured Confederate transport  at Memphis 6 June 1862. The US Navy Register for 1863 listed her as assigned to the Mississippi Squadron but no other record of her service in the Union Navy has been found.
  was a  launched 24 March 1898, sailed with the Great White Fleet and sold for scrapping 23 January 1924
  was an  under construction in 1947 when her contract was canceled
  is an  commissioned in 1991 and currently in active service

See also 
 
 Kentucky, a riverboat which sank near Shreveport, Louisiana in 1865 with the loss of 200 lives.  See List of shipwrecks of the United States.

History of Kentucky
United States Navy ship names